Manuel Enrique Félix López (November 17, 1937 – January 1, 2004) was an Ecuadorian businessman and politician.

Early life 

He was born in Junin, the fourth of the 13 children of Quinche J. Felix Rezabala and Jacinta Maria Lopez Loor. Lopez was born into a family of merchants and closely linked to the politics of the region, as his father was the mayor. His family lived in Calceta.

Career 

During his youth, he was councilor of Bolivar twice (1966 and 1979). In 1970 he was appointed mayor. With the return of democracy in Ecuador, he was elected as Councilor of Manabí (1981–1984), and served as Director of the "Centro de Rehabilitación de Manabí CRM", on behalf of municipalities and former President of the extinct "Junta de Recursos Hidráulicos de Jipijapa".

In 1984, he was involved in the release of national political figure Leon Febres-Cordero. Febres Cordero won the elections for President of Ecuador. Meanwhile, Manuel Felix Lopez was elected Deputy, continuing until 1988.

In 1985, he was appointed as a delegate to the Andean Parliament, based in Bogota, the same year he was its vice president.

During 1991 he and other social Christian deserters helped Sixto Duran Ballen to found the Republican Unity Party. Manuel Felix was appointed Congressman because he was in the list of alternate candidates, and the elected deputy Roberto Dunn was designated as minister of government. Félix was the National Director of the governing party. Once more, the national Congress delegated him to the Andean Parliament, now based in La Paz, Bolivia, where he was declared as the guest of honor by mayor Rolando Enrique Rojas.

One of his achievements as National Deputy was the management of the law No. 116 of April 29, 1996; that creates the "Instituto Tecnológico Superior Agropecuario de Manabí" (ITSAM, as the Spanish initials) as the first university of Calceta.

In 1999 the National Congress of Ecuador created law No. 99-25 of April 30, that changes the name of the ITSAM, in the "Escuela Superior Politécnica Agropecuaria de Manabí".

In 2000, he was a candidate for Mayor of Calceta, his last appearance in Ecuadorian politics before his death at Portoviejo.

Legacy 
In 2004 as a post-mortem tribute, a group of Calceta citizens proposed that the name of Félix be added to  ESPAM and on June 15, 2006, the Ecuadorian National Congress published a reform to law 99-25 that highlighted Félix as a "tireless dreamer and idealist who achieved with perseverance in the National Congress the creation of the "Instituto Tecnológico Superior Agropecuario de Manabí (ITSAM)" later called ESPAM, and now "Escuela Superior Politécnica Agropecuaria de Manabí "Manuel Félix López".

See also 
 Luis Félix López
 Calceta
 León Febres Cordero
 Sixto Durán Ballén
 Lucho Gatica

References 

1937 births
2004 deaths
Mayors of places in Ecuador
Members of the National Congress (Ecuador)
People from Manabí Province
Social Christian Party (Ecuador) politicians